Leopold Ehrmann (March 6, 1886 Strakonice – April 11, 1951 Chicago)  was a German speaking architect living in Prague.

Ehrmann was born in Strakonice, in Southern Bohemia, then part of Austria-Hungary, as a son of local haberdashery shop owner. He studied in Pilsen and Vienna and set up an architectural practice in Prague. His notable projects included works carried out for the Prague Jewish community: the synagogues in Prague Smíchov and Karlín, the gate house, columbarium and prayer hall at the New Jewish Cemetery and an apartment building in Prague’s New Town worked on with František Zelenka. Ehrmann’s best-known work is the Cubist tombstone for Franz Kafka family at the New Jewish Cemetery (1924). In 1940 Ehrmann and his wife immigrated to the United States and settled in Chicago where he died in 1951.

See also
Franz Kafka

References

Literature
Lukeš, Zdeněk. Splátka dluhu : Praha a její německy hovořící architekti 1900-1938. Praha: Fraktály, 2002. .
Ehrmann, Robert. Strakoničtí souvěrci - ze života Židů na malém městě. Praha: Sefer 1998.

1886 births
1951 deaths
Czechoslovak architects
Jewish architects
People from Strakonice
Czech Jews
German Bohemian people
Czechoslovak emigrants to the United States